Bruceanols are quassinoids isolated from Brucea antidysenterica.

Bruceanols
 Bruceanol A
 Bruceanol B
 Bruceanol C
 Bruceanol D
 Bruceanol E
 Bruceanol F
 Bruceanol G
 Bruceanol H

References

Quassinoids